Lester Morris is a Saint Kitts and Nevis professional football manager.

Career
From February to September 2008 he coached the Saint Kitts and Nevis national football team. Later he coaches the Conaree FC

References

External links
Profile at Soccerway.com

Year of birth missing (living people)
Living people
Saint Kitts and Nevis football managers
Saint Kitts and Nevis national football team managers
Place of birth missing (living people)